Christina Helen Johanne Trevanion (born 12 June 1981) is a British auctioneer and television presenter.

She is a partner in the firm of Trevanion & Dean, auctioneers and valuers, based in Whitchurch, Shropshire. Trevanion founded the firm with Aaron Dean, having previously worked at Christie's.

She has appeared on a number of BBC daytime television programmes as an expert in antiques and as an auctioneer, including Bargain Hunt, Antiques Road Trip, Put Your Money Where Your Mouth Is and Flog It!.

She is now presenting along with Will Kirk a new series titled The Travelling Auctioneers.

Personal life

Trevanion is the daughter of David Trevanion and Hazel Trevanion (née Percival). She attended Southampton Solent University after completing her secondary education at Bishop Heber High School.

Trevanion is married, with two daughters.

References

English auctioneers
English television presenters
Living people
1981 births
Television personalities from Shropshire